Silverton is a statutory town that is the county seat, the most populous community, and the only incorporated municipality in San Juan County, Colorado, United States. The town is located in a remote part of the western San Juan Mountains, a range of the Rocky Mountains. The first mining claims were made in mountains above the Silverton in 1860, near the end of the Colorado Gold Rush and when the land was still controlled by the Utes. Silverton was established shortly after the Utes ceded the region in the 1873 Brunot Agreement, and the town boomed from silver mining until the Panic of 1893 led to a collapse of the silver market, and boomed again from gold mining until the recession caused by the Panic of 1907. The entire town is included as a federally designated National Historic Landmark District, the Silverton Historic District.

Originally called "Bakers Park", Silverton sits in a flat area of the Animas River valley and is surrounded by steep peaks. Most of the peaks surrounding Silverton are thirteeners, the highest being Storm Peak, at 13,487 feet. The town is less than 15 miles from 7 of Colorado's 53 fourteeners, and is known as one of the premier gateways into the Colorado backcountry.

Silverton's last operating mine closed in 1992, and the community now depends primarily on tourism and government remediation and preservation projects. Silverton is well known because of the Durango and Silverton Narrow Gauge Railroad, a former mine train that is now a National Historic Landmark, and internationally recognized events such as the Hardrock Hundred Mile Endurance Run. The town population reached 637 in the U.S. Census 2010.

History

Mining era 
Settlements in the area surrounding present-day Silverton began in 1860 after a group of prospectors lead by Charles Baker made their way into the San Juan Mountains searching for gold. The area was soon referred to as "Baker's Park", and the group found traces of placer gold nearby.

Long before settlement, the area was regularly explored by the Anasazi, and later the Utes, who hunted and lived in the San Juans during the summer. There is also speculation that Spanish explorers and fur traders ventured into the area before Baker's 1860 expedition.

After the Brunot Agreement with the Utes in 1873, which exchanged  for the Southern Ute Indian Reservation and $25,000 per year, several mining camps were constructed. These would later become the communities of Howardsville, Eureka, and Silverton.

Silverton was founded by mining entrepreneurs William Kearnes, Dempsey Reese, and Thomas Blair in 1874. The region boomed after George Howard and R. J. McNutt discovered the Sunnyside silver vein along Hurricane Peak. Gold was then discovered in 1882, which helped the region weather the Panic of 1893 far better than other mining communities, such as Aspen or Creede. The Sunnyside Mine would become one of Colorado's longest running and most productive mines. The mine was shut down after the 1929 stock market crash, but was acquired by Standard Metals Corp. in 1959, and reopened, finding gold in 1973 with the Little Mary vein. The region's economy was dealt a devastating blow in 1992 when the mine and the corresponding Shenandoah-Dives mill, the last operating in the region, permanently closed. The closure meant the end of jobs for over one third of Silverton's workforce.

Tourism era 
The town has a long history of tourism and efforts to market tourism by the Silverton Commercial Club (now the Chamber of Commerce) dates back as early as 1913. By the 1930s, interest in the “Old West” was already attracting tourists from around the world, for which the newly constructed U.S. Route 550 further enabled access. Following World War II, the town's railroad, originally operated by the Denver & Rio Grande Western for the purpose of shipping ore to Durango, became a major tourist attraction after it was featured in several popular western films. By the 1970s, with almost all mining operations in the region shuttered, the train was almost entirely operated for the purpose of tourism.

Tourism continued to increase in the latter part of the 20th century, but Silverton's harsh winters and isolation made it a summer-only attraction. Following the closure of Sunnyside, Silverton lost much of its tax base as the town's population dwindled to just over 500, a quarter of its peak population one hundred years earlier.

The town's population, buoyed by strong summer tourism and an emerging winter economy, has since recovered. The construction of the expert-level ski area Silverton Mountain in 2002 marked the beginning of Silverton's year-round tourism. Another ski area, the Purgatory Resort, is marketed as being within the Durango Metropolitan Area but is actually closer to Silverton than it is to Durango. Winter festivals such as Skijoring have brought crowds that rival those in the summer, and the potential for new winter activities such as the expansion of the town-operated ski hill could permanently improve Silverton's winter tourism. The town has also become well known for its winter backcountry activities such as snowmobiling, ice climbing, and backcountry skiing.

Both the town and the Durango and Silverton Narrow Gauge Railroad were designated a National Historic Landmark in 1961. In 1966, the entire town was placed on the National Register of Historic Places. These boundaries were expanded in 1997 with the addition of the Shenandoah-Dives mill and other historical structures.

Notable disasters 
The area surrounding Silverton has been the scene of several well-documented disasters, many of them due to avalanches and mining accidents.

1906 avalanches 
Five miners perished in a slide at the Sunnyside mine in January 1906. Only a few months later, twelve miners were killed in another slide at the Shenandoah Mine, making it one of the most deadly slides in the history of Colorado.

1918 influenza pandemic 
The Spanish Flu arrived in Silverton near the end of October, 1918, and quickly devastated the community. In a single week, 125 people, more than 5% of the town's population, perished from flu complications. By the time the pandemic waned the following March, 246 people had died, accounting to more than 10% of the population. This gave Silverton the dubious honor of having the highest mortality rate for the Spanish Flu in the entire nation.

Lake Emma disaster 
On 4 June 1978, when the water from Lake Emma collapsed into Sunnyside mine, shooting out of a portal with a force that toppled a 20-ton locomotive. Fortunately, no injuries were reported as disaster occurred on a Sunday when nobody was present in the mine.

Gold King Mine disaster 
In 2015, the EPA and its contractors caused an environmental catastrophe when they accidentally destroyed the plug holding water trapped inside the Gold King Mine, which caused three million US gallons (eleven thousand cubic meters) of mine waste water and tailings, to flow into a tributary of the Animas River.

Demographics

As of the census of 2000, there were 531 people, 255 households, and 149 families residing in the town. The racial makeup of the town was 97.36% White, 0.75% Native American, 0.38% Pacific Islander, 0.75% from other races, and 0.75% from two or more races. Hispanic or Latino of any race were 7.72% of the population.

There were 255 households, out of which 24.7% had children under the age of 18 living with them, 43.5% were married couples living together, 9.4% had a female householder with no husband present, and 41.2% were non-families. 36.9% of all households were made up of individuals, and 4.7% had someone living alone who was 65 years of age or older. The average household size was 2.06 and the average family size was 2.63.

20.7% of town residents were under the age of 18, 4.0% from 18 to 24, 28.4% from 25 to 44, 39.9% from 45 to 64, and 7.0% who were 65 years of age or older. The median age was 44 years. For every 100 females, there were 108.2 males. For every 100 females age 18 and over, there were 110.5 males.

The median income for a household in the town was $30,486, and the median income for a family was $39,375. Males had a median income of $30,588 versus $19,886 for females. The per capita income for the town was $16,839. About 14.0% of families and 21.6% of the population were below the poverty line, including 29.4% of those under age 18 and 7.1% of those age 65 or over.

The local school system has a total of 53 K-through-12 students as of November 2006.

Geography
Silverton sits in a flat area of the Animas River valley and is surrounded by several thirteeners, the highest being Storm Peak, at 13,487 feet. The town is less than 15 miles from seven of Colorado's 53 "fourteeners", i.e., mountain peaks with a summit elevation of at least .

Climate
Silverton has an alpine subarctic climate (Köppen climate classification Dfc) with very cold, snowy winters and cool to warm summers with adequate precipitation year-round.

Notable people
Robert Baer, author and former case officer at the Central Intelligence Agency briefly retired here.
Anton Larson, Trooper in Teddy Roosevelt's Rough Riders, Spanish–American War
Arthur Pink, evangelical pastor and writer, lived in Silverton briefly
Harold Ross, founding editor of The New Yorker who was a native of Aspen, Colorado
Bill Alsup, former IndyCar driver

In popular culture
In the novel The Christopher Killer by Alane Ferguson, the main setting is in Silverton.

Country singer C. W. McCall recorded "The Silverton," about the Silverton and Durango Railroad, on his 1975 album Black Bear Road.

Night Passage (1957) was filmed in Silverton and Durango, Colorado.

Shaun White's secret training facility for the Vancouver Olympics (2010) called "Project X" was located on Silverton Mountain.

The board game Silverton by Mayfair Games is named after this location.

For several years in the 1970s and 1980s, Silverton was the site for the International Speed-Skiing Championship.

List of historic structures

See also

 List of municipalities in Colorado
 Durango and Silverton Narrow Gauge Railroad
 Hardrock Hundred Mile Endurance Run
 Million Dollar Highway
 Old Hundred Gold Mine
 San Juan Mountains
 San Juan Skyway National Scenic Byway
 Shenandoah-Dives (Mayflower) Mill
 Alpine Loop National Back Country Byway

References

External links

 Silverton Chamber of Commerce Website
 CDOT map of the Town of Silverton
 Silverton Town Government Website
 Silverton history and photos at Western Mining History
 Silverton Historic District photos and documentation from Historic American Buildings Survey
 Silverton, Colorado photograph by Ansel Adams in 1951
 The Silverton Branch of the D&RGW
 Silverton Standard Newspaper Website

Towns in San Juan County, Colorado
County seats in Colorado
Mining communities in Colorado
San Juan Mountains (Colorado)
Historic districts on the National Register of Historic Places in Colorado
National Register of Historic Places in San Juan County, Colorado
National Historic Landmarks in Colorado
National Historic Landmark Districts
Towns in Colorado